Grov may refer to:

Places
Grov, Kinn, a village in Kinn municipality in Vestland county, Norway
Grov, Stord, a village in Stord municipality in Vestland county, Norway
Grov, Troms, a village in Tjeldsund municipality, Troms og Finnmark county, Norway

People
Martinus Grov, a Norwegian archer